AWST may refer to:

 Australian Western Standard Time. See Time in Australia
 Aviation Week & Space Technology